Holy Child Academy or "HCA", colloquially pronounced as , is a secondary school run by the Roman Catholic Diocese of Pagadian in Pagadian City, Philippines. HCA is the oldest among the Diocesan Schools of Pagadian and the second oldest school in Zamboanga del Sur.

Brief history

Founded as Pagadian Academy, a parochial school started by Fr. Jose Ma. Reyes of the Society of Jesus in 1940. The Academy was the second school to open in the Province of Zamboanga del Sur after the Southern Mindanao Colleges. As the first sectarian school, the Academy pioneered Catholic education in the province.

With the departure of the Jesuits from Pagadian, the Missionary Society of St. Columban took control of the Academy until the 1970s when the Roman Catholic Diocese of Pagadian took over. The academy shared the same fate with other Columban-controlled schools; namely, the Star of the Sea High School, Immaculate Heart Academy, and Saint Columban College. The four schools started the now collectively known as the Diocesan Schools of Pagadian with fourteen other schools.

In the 1980s, the Academy became the Holy Child Academy, named after the "Holy Child", also known as the "Child Jesus" or Sto. Niño, patron of Pagadian.

Campuses

The Academy has two campuses, both in Barangay San Jose of the city.
High school campus
Previously served as the grade school campus of Saint Columban College and later as the Hangop Kabataan Center (Cebuano for "Embrace the Child Center"), a school for children with special needs. The high school campus houses the new high school building completed in 2011 and since August 2014, also the preschool.
Old high school campus
Located beside the San Jose Parish Church.

References

External links
 Catholic Educational Association of the Philippines
 Social network on Ning

Schools in Zamboanga del Sur
Catholic elementary schools in the Philippines
Catholic secondary schools in the Philippines
Schools in Pagadian